The 1982–83 season was Stoke City's 76th season in the Football League and 50th in the First Division.

More transfer activity took place in the summer of 1982 with club legend Denis Smith departing the club after 14 seasons at the Victoria Ground. Mark Chamberlain arrived from City rivals Port Vale and the 1982–83 season saw Stoke produce some high quality football. They were involved in a number of exciting matches most notably a 4–4 draw with Luton Town in September. Stoke were neither in a fight for a top half finish nor relegation and finished in a safe mid-table position of 13th.

Season review

League
After one season at the helm manager Ritchie Barker continued to clear out with Denis Smith becoming the last member of the 1972 League Cup winning squad to leave the Victoria Ground. Also released were Paul A. Johnson and Steve Kirk. Barker then went to his old club Wolverhampton Wanderers and brought in Derek Parkin and George Berry to fill the gap in defence. With the 1982–83 season fast approaching he sold last season's top goalscorer Lee Chapman to Arsenal for £500,000 and used £200,000 of that to bring in Mickey Thomas. He also turned to near neighbours Port Vale and signed Mark Harrison plus the Chamberlain brothers Mark and  Neville in a triple signing.

Former defender Bill Asprey was appointed as assistant manager and with the new arrivals Stoke produced some eye catching performances. Their attacking style of play won many admirers and with Mark Chamberlain catching the eye he earned himself an England call-up during the season, unfortunately his brother, Neville, failed to make an impact. There were some terrific team performances during the course of the season with the most notable being a classic 4–4 draw with Luton Town in September. Stoke finished an entertaining season in 13th place with 57 points. Chairman Percy Axon died at the end of the season. He was replaced by Frank Edwards who also died two years later.

FA Cup
Stoke beat Sheffield United 3–2 in an entertaining replay but were then ousted 2–0 by Liverpool at Anfield.

League Cup
Stoke again failed to make it past the second round this time West Ham United knocking City out of the League Cup.

Final league table

Results

Stoke's score comes first

Legend

Football League First Division

FA Cup

League Cup

Friendlies

Squad statistics

References

External links

Stoke City F.C. seasons
Stoke